Michael Andre Vadseth (born 14 March 1974) is a retired Norwegian football striker.

A prolific goalscorer in Brattvåg IL, Vadseth was picked up by Lyn Fotball in 1996. Securing promotion to 1997 Eliteserien, he only amassed five league games in two seasons and was let go. He played for Fossum IF in 1998, then Manglerud Star in 1999. He continued playing for them under the moniker FK Oslo Øst, until 2004 when he took one year in Skeid before eventually becoming playing assistant coach of Nordstrand IF.

References

1974 births
Living people
People from Haram, Norway
Norwegian footballers
Brattvåg IL players
Lyn Fotball players
Manglerud Star Toppfotball players
Skeid Fotball players
Norwegian First Division players
Eliteserien players
Association football forwards
Sportspeople from Møre og Romsdal